Vitex gaumeri (also called fiddlewood, walking lady, or yax-nik) is a species of plant in the family Lamiaceae. It is found in Belize, Guatemala, Honduras, and Mexico.

References

gaumeri
Endangered plants
Taxonomy articles created by Polbot